The Northern Ireland Fire and Rescue Service (NIFRS; ;; formerly Northern Ireland Fire Brigade) is the statutory fire and rescue service for Northern Ireland. The NIFRS is overseen by the Northern Ireland Fire and Rescue Service Board, which in turn is subordinate to the Department of Health. NIFRS has a workforce of around 2,230 personnel.

Service Headquarters is located in Lisburn Co. Antrim.

The current Chief Fire & Rescue Officer is Andy Hearn.

History 
Organised firefighting began in what is now Northern Ireland in the 19th century. In 1800, the Belfast Borough Police were established and firefighting was one of their duties. The firefighting units were later separated from the police to form the Belfast Fire Brigade.

Until World War II, towns had their own fire services. In 1942, Northern Ireland's fire services were amalgamated into one, though they were separate from the National Fire Service that covered the rest of the United Kingdom. After the war, the service was split into the re-established Belfast Fire Brigade and the Northern Ireland Fire Authority, which covered the rest of Northern Ireland.

On 1 October 1973, the two fire services were merged into a single service, named Northern Ireland Fire Brigade. In 2006, the service adopted its current name of Northern Ireland Fire and Rescue Service.

Fire stations 

NIFRS has 68 fire stations split into four geographical command areas.

It is headquartered in Belfast, with a north & west district headquarters at Whitla fire station, and a south & east district headquarters at Knock fire station.

It is headquartered in Ballymena, with district headquarters at Ballymena, Coleraine, and Glengormley.

It is headquartered in Portadown, with district headquarters in Bangor, Downpatrick, Newry, and Portadown.

It is headquartered in Derry, with district headquarters in Cookstown, Enniskillen, Derry, and Omagh.

Statistics

In 2016/17, NIFRS received 36,069 emergency calls, an increase of 7.9% on the previous year. Of these calls a total of 23,740 were mobilised.

See also
 Fire service in the United Kingdom
 Firefighters
 List of fire departments
 List of British firefighters killed in the line of duty
 List of Government departments and agencies in Northern Ireland
 History of the Belfast Fire Brigade

References

External links
 

Non-Departmental Public Bodies of the Northern Ireland Executive
Fire and rescue services of the United Kingdom